Canberk Dilaver (born 1 June 1993) is a Turkish footballer who plays for 24 Erzincanspor.

Canberk has twice played for the Turkey U20s.

References

1993 births
Sportspeople from Samsun
Living people
Turkish footballers
Turkey youth international footballers
Association football midfielders
Samsunspor footballers
Orduspor footballers
Manisaspor footballers
1461 Trabzon footballers
Adanaspor footballers
Göztepe S.K. footballers
Giresunspor footballers
Elazığspor footballers
Uşakspor footballers
24 Erzincanspor footballers
Süper Lig players
TFF First League players
TFF Second League players